Percy King (2 September 1889 – 9 December 1967) was an Australian cricketer. He played one first-class match for New South Wales in 1919/20.

See also
 List of New South Wales representative cricketers

References

External links
 

1889 births
1967 deaths
Australian cricketers
New South Wales cricketers
Cricketers from Melbourne